William Shepherd Allen (22 June 1831 – 15 January 1915) was an English Liberal politician. He also worked as a farmer and served as an MP in New Zealand.

Biography
Allen was born at Manchester, the son of William Allen and his wife Maria Shepherd. His father was JP for Staffordshire, residing at Woodhead Hall, Cheadle. Allen was educated at Wadham College, Oxford. He graduated with a BA in law and history in 1854, and an MA in 1857.

In 1869, Allen married Elizabeth Penelope Candlish, the daughter of John Candlish MP for Sunderland. Their eldest son William was later MP for Newcastle-under-Lyme. Another son, Colonel Sir Stephen Allen, (1882–1964) was a New Zealand lawyer, farmer, local body politician, and Mayor of Morrinsville. He served in World War I and in the Territorial Army, and was Administrator of the colony of Western Samoa (now Samoa) 1928–31.

He was a devout Methodist and wrote several religious papers.

Allen was elected as member of parliament for Newcastle-under-Lyme in 1865. He held the seat until 1886. In later life he shared his time between Woodhead Hall in England and his property Annandale near Morrinsville in New Zealand.

In 1890 he was elected MP for Te Aroha in New Zealand, but his election was disallowed on petition by William Fraser in 1891. The judges disqualified Allen from standing in the Te Aroha electorate for 12 months and he expressed disappointment that he could not contest the resulting , which was won by Fraser.

He died at Cheadle on 15 January 1915 at the age of 83 and is buried at St Giles the Abbot's Churchyard in Cheadle. His wife died in 1922.

Publications
 The Teaching of Christ With Respect to the Future Punishment of the Wicked
 The present position of Wesleyan Methodism : the causes of its decreasing numbers, and the means which must be adopted to secure an increase

References

External links

1831 births
1915 deaths
Alumni of Wadham College, Oxford
Liberal Party (UK) MPs for English constituencies
UK MPs 1865–1868
UK MPs 1868–1874
UK MPs 1874–1880
UK MPs 1880–1885
UK MPs 1885–1886
New Zealand MPs for North Island electorates
New Zealand farmers
Politics of the Borough of Newcastle-under-Lyme
Members of the New Zealand House of Representatives
Unsuccessful candidates in the 1893 New Zealand general election
19th-century New Zealand politicians
Liberal Unionist Party MPs for English constituencies
Members of the Parliament of the United Kingdom for Newcastle-under-Lyme